Langvassåga is a river that flows out of the lake Langvatnet in the municipality of Rana in Nordland county, Norway. It flows in a southeastern direction and almost immediately, it is joined by the river Røvassåga. It then continues a short distance southwards before joining the main river Ranelva, just south of the village of Røssvoll. The river passes by the Mo i Rana Airport, Røssvoll.

Media gallery

See also
List of rivers in Norway

References

Rana, Norway
Rivers of Nordland
Rivers of Norway